A list of films produced in Italy in 1937 (see 1937 in film):

See also
List of Italian films of 1936
List of Italian films of 1938

External links
Italian films of 1937 at the Internet Movie Database

Italian
1937
Films